The 2015 Santaizi ATP Challenger was a professional tennis tournament played on carpet courts. It was the second edition of the tournament which was part of the 2015 ATP Challenger Tour. It took place in Taipei, Taiwan between 27 April and 3 May.

Singles main-draw entrants

Seeds

 1 Rankings are as of April 20, 2015

Other entrants
The following players received wildcards into the singles main draw:
  Yi Chu-huan
  Hung Jui-chen
  Wang Chieh-fu
  Ho Chih-jen

The following players received entry from the qualifying draw:
  Matthew Barton
  Yu Cheng-yu
  Yuuya Kibi
  Toshihide Matsui

Champions

Singles

 Sam Groth def.  Konstantin Kravchuk, 6–7(5–7), 6–4, 7–6(7–3)

Doubles

 Matthew Ebden /  Wang Chieh-fu def.  Sanchai Ratiwatana /  Sonchat Ratiwatana, 6–1, 6–4

References
 Combo Main Draw

Santaizi ATP Challenger
Santaizi ATP Challenger
2015 in Taiwanese tennis